The 40th Regiment Illinois Volunteer Infantry was an infantry regiment that served in the Union Army during the American Civil War.

Service
The 40th Illinois Infantry was organized at Springfield, Illinois and mustered into Federal service on August 10, 1861.

The regiment was mustered out on July 24, 1865.

Participated in the Battle of Shiloh, Siege of Vicksburg, Battle of Missionary Ridge, Battle of Kennesaw Mountain, Siege of Atlanta, and the March to the Sea

Total strength and casualties
The regiment suffered 6 officers and 119 enlisted men who were killed in action or mortally wounded and 4 officers and 117 enlisted men who died of disease, for a total of 246 fatalities.

Commanders
 Colonel Stephen G. Hicks - discharged on October 13, 1862.

See also
List of Illinois Civil War Units
Illinois in the American Civil War

Notes

References
The Civil War Archive

Units and formations of the Union Army from Illinois
1861 establishments in Illinois
Military units and formations established in 1861
Military units and formations disestablished in 1865